King of Pro-Wrestling (2012) was a professional wrestling pay-per-view (PPV) event promoted by New Japan Pro-Wrestling (NJPW). The event took place on October 8, 2012, in Tokyo at Ryōgoku Kokugikan. The event featured nine matches, five of which were contested for championships. This event marked the first time a NJPW PPV could be bought outside Japan, through Ustream. It was the first event under the King of Pro-Wrestling name.

Storylines
King of Pro-Wrestling featured nine professional wrestling matches that involved different wrestlers from pre-existing scripted feuds and storylines. Wrestlers portrayed villains, heroes, or less distinguishable characters in the scripted events that built tension and culminated in a wrestling match or series of matches.

Event
The opening match saw Manabu Nakanishi return from a back injury and wrestle his first match since June 2011. The second match saw Forever Hooligans (Alex Koslov and Rocky Romero) make their successful defense of the IWGP Junior Heavyweight Tag Team Championship against the Time Splitters (Alex Shelley and Kushida). The event featured two title switches; in the first Low Ki defeated Kota Ibushi to win the IWGP Junior Heavyweight Championship for the third time and end Ibushi's two-month-long reign, while in the second, K.E.S. (Davey Boy Smith Jr. and Lance Archer) defeated Tencozy (Hiroyoshi Tenzan and Satoshi Kojima) to win the IWGP Tag Team Championship for the first time. The event also featured a grudge match between former No Limit tag team partners Tetsuya Naito and Yujiro Takahashi, which was used as a way to write off Naito, who had suffered a knee injury and would have to undergo a reconstructive knee surgery. He would remain sidelined until Dominion 6.22 in June 2013. The event concluded with Shinsuke Nakamura making his second successful defense of the IWGP Intercontinental Championship against Hirooki Goto and Hiroshi Tanahashi his fourth successful defense of the IWGP Heavyweight Championship against Minoru Suzuki.

Reception
The main event between Tanahashi and Suzuki was later given a five-star rating by sports journalist Dave Meltzer, making it the first NJPW match in nearly twelve years to receive the rating. At the end of the year, readers of Meltzer's Wrestling Observer Newsletter voted the match the 2012 Match of the Year, while also naming the event as a whole the Best Major Wrestling Show of the year.

Results

References

External links
The official New Japan Pro-Wrestling website

2012
2012 in professional wrestling
October 2012 events in Japan
2012 in Tokyo
Professional wrestling in Tokyo